James Cooney (July 27, 1860 – March 14, 1903) was an Irishman serving in the United States Marine Corps during the Boxer Rebellion who received the Medal of Honor for bravery.

Biography
Cooney was born July 27, 1860, in Limerick, Ireland and enlisted into the Marine Corps August 19, 1889. After entering the Marine Corps he was sent to fight in the Chinese Boxer Rebellion.

He received his Medal for his actions in Tientsin, China July 13, 1900. The Medal was presented to him January 24, 1902.

He died March 14, 1903, in Vallejo, California and is buried there in Mare Island Cemetery. His grave can be found in section D, row 10, plot 093.

Medal of Honor citation
Rank and organization: Private, U.S. Marine Corps. Born: 27 July 1860, Limerick, Ireland. Accredited to: Massachusetts. G.O. No.: 55, 19 July 1901.

Citation:

In the presence of the enemy during the battle near Tientsin, China, 13 July 1900, Cooney distinguished himself by meritorious conduct.

See also

List of Medal of Honor recipients
List of Medal of Honor recipients for the Boxer Rebellion

References

External links

1860 births
1903 deaths
19th-century Irish people
United States Marine Corps Medal of Honor recipients
United States Marines
American military personnel of the Boxer Rebellion
Irish emigrants to the United States (before 1923)
Irish-born Medal of Honor recipients
Military personnel from Limerick (city)
Boxer Rebellion recipients of the Medal of Honor